The Children's Literature Lecture Award (known as the May Hill Arbuthnot Lecture from 1970-2020) is an annual event sponsored by the Association for Library Service to Children (ALSC), a division of the American Library Association. The organization counts selection as the lecturer among its "Book & Media Awards", for selection recognizes a career contribution to children's literature. At the same time, the lecturer "shall prepare a paper considered to be a significant contribution to the field of children's literature", to be delivered as the Children's Literature Lecture and to be published in the ALSC journal Children & Libraries.

The lecture was established in 1969 to honor the educator May Hill Arbuthnot. Arbuthnot was one creator of "Dick and Jane" readers and she wrote the first three editions of Children and Books (Scott, Foresman 1947, 1957, 1964). When informed of the new honorary lecture in her name, 'she recalled "that long stretch of years when I was dashing from one end of the country to the other, bringing children and books together by way of the spoken word."' It was renamed the "Children's Literature Lecture Award" in January 2020.

The lecturer may be an "author, critic, librarian, historian, or teacher of children's literature, of any country". The Children's Literature Lecture Award Committee selects one from a list of nominations, a process currently completed in January 15 to 18 months before the event. Then institutions apply to be the host: any "library school, department of education in college or university, or a children's library system". Several months later the same committee selects the host institution from the applicants.

Lectures

Repeat lectures

University of Wisconsin–Milwaukee has hosted two lectures.

Two lecture titles allude to The Secret Garden, a 1911 novel by Frances Hodgson Burnett.

See also

References

External links
 2009 May Hill Arbuthnot Honor Lecture —example event poster

Annual events in the United States
Recurring events established in 1969
American children's literary awards
American Library Association awards
Lectures
1969 establishments in the United States
English-language literary awards